The loros was a long, narrow and embroidered cloth, which was wrapped around the torso and dropped over the left hand.  It was one of the most important and distinctive parts of the most formal and ceremonial type of imperial Byzantine costume, worn only by the Imperial family and a few of the most senior officials. It developed out of the trabea triumphalis of the Roman consuls.  There were different male and female versions. Byzantine sources speak of the "loros costume" as the loros dictated the rest of the imperial outfit.  The slightly less formal, and more secular, imperial costume, which was also that normally worn by high officials on official occasions, was the chlamys costume. Underneath either the loros or the chlamys were worn the divetesion (διβητήσιον), a long silk robe, and a tunic.

Male

The first representations of the loros are on coins from the reign of Justinian II (r. 685–695 and 705–711). Until the 10th century, the male loros was wrapped around the torso in a specific way, following the ancient trabea. However, increasingly from the 11th century, the loros acquired a new design. The new loros had a loop that went round the neck and was pulled on over the head. By the Komnenian dynasty, the old loros was completely abandoned, after a period when both designs are seen. By the 14th century the strip down the front may have been sewn onto the tunic beneath, and the loros may have been called a diadema instead.  Despite the modifications, the loros was the most important part of the imperial costume up until the end of the empire in the 15th century. 

Although in practice it was, according to the De Ceremoniis by Constantine VII, worn only in exceptional occasions such as on Easter Sunday, Pentecost, sometimes other feasts, and to receive important foreign visitors, the loros was an integral part of imperial portraiture.  In earlier periods it was worn in triumphal processions.

The loros was also worn at Easter by the "twelve dignitaries", holders of the ranks of magistros and anthypatos, as well as by the Eparch of Constantinople and the zoste patrikia during the ceremonies of their promotion. It was said to symbolize the winding-sheet of Christ, with the officials as the Twelve Apostles. It is also worn by archangels in Byzantine art, which spread to medieval art in the West, as they were regarded as the high officials of God. It seems the loros-costume was not worn at the coronation of the Emperor, although he was given it in the course of the ceremony, and when crowned by Christ in art always wears it.

From the 13th century the loros began to be shown worn in imperial portraits of other Orthodox rulers, such those of Serbia, Georgia and the Armenian Kingdom of Cilicia.  In the Bulgarian Gospels of Tsar Ivan Alexander, the tsar and his son both wear it.

Female
At first empresses wore essentially the same form as emperors, but from around the 9th century a new style appears. The hanging end was longer and much broader, and after reaching down to the ankles turned upwards to be folded over the left forearm, or fastened or tucked into the belt.  The wide end has the appearance in paintings of a round-topped shield tapering to a point, at an oblique angle.  In the 13th century this shield shape is no longer seen, and the female form returns to being that of the now modified male one for the last phase of the empire.  Empresses also wore a wide jewelled "superhumeral" collar in matching styles to the loros, and perhaps attached to it. This was the distinctive garment of empresses and also worn on other occasions, and copied by other upper-class women; the modified male loros created much the same effect.

Gallery

Notes

References

Byzantine regalia